Mehmed Reshid Pasha may refer to the following Ottoman statesmen:

Reşid Mehmed Pasha (1780–1836), grand vizier of the Ottoman Empire
Mehmed Rashid Pasha (1825–1876), governor of Syria Vilayet and minister of foreign affairs